Derrick Kakooza (born 23 October 2002) is a Ugandan footballer who currently plays as a forward for Egyptian side ENPPI.

Club career
Born in Kampala, Kakooza started his career with the Naguru Police Academy, before joining Police Kampala. Having been promoted to the first team with Police, his impressive performances in the 2021 Africa U-20 Cup of Nations linked him with a move to Belgian side Anderlecht. His league performances were also good, scoring eight goals in eighteen games across two seasons.

After the move to Anderlecht fell through, Kakooza completed a move to Latvian side Valmiera in early 2022 from Police FC.

Having played one game in the Finnish Cup for KuPS, Kakooza signed for Egyptian side ENPPI in January 2023.

Career statistics

Club

Notes

International

Honours
Uganda U20
Africa U-20 Cup of Nations; Runner-up: 2021

References

2002 births
Living people
Sportspeople from Kampala
Ugandan footballers
Uganda youth international footballers
Uganda international footballers
Association football forwards
Uganda Premier League players
Police FC (Uganda) players
Valmieras FK players
Kuopion Palloseura players
ENPPI SC players
Ugandan expatriate footballers
Expatriate footballers in Latvia
Ugandan expatriate sportspeople in Finland
Expatriate footballers in Finland
Ugandan expatriate sportspeople in Egypt
Expatriate footballers in Egypt